Dasypeltis confusa, commonly known as the confusing egg-eater or the diamond-back egg-eater, is a species of snake in the family Colubridae. The species is endemic to Africa.

Geographic range
D. confusa is found in Benin, Cameroon, Chad, Ethiopia, Gabon, Ghana, Guinea, Guinea-Bissau, Ivory Coast, Kenya, Liberia, Mali, Nigeria, Rwanda, Senegal, Sierra Leone, South Sudan, Togo, and Uganda.

Habitat

Reproduction
D. confusa is oviparous.

References

Further reading
Trape, Jean-François; Mané, Youssouph (2006). "Le genre Dasypeltis Wagler (Serpentes : Colubridae) en Afrique de l'Ouest : description de trois espèces et d'une sous-espèce nouvelles. Bulletin de la Société Herpétologique de France 119: 27–56. (Dasypeltis confusa, new species). (in French).

Reptiles described in 2006
Snakes of Africa
Colubrids